Angels of Mission is a TVB series consisting of 20 episodes. It stars Charmaine Sheh, Sonija Kwok and Shirley Yeung as police who work for the CID. They try to balance their work and personal lives.

Plot
Yiu Lai Fa (Charmaine Sheh) and Tong Bo Yee, Bowie (Shirley Yeung) are part of the police squad in the Central Intelligence Division (C.I.D.). Fa is a sergeant. With the Counter-Terrorist Unit (CTU) requiring more members, Fa and Bowie are transferred to the CTU, for the time being. Song Lok Kei, Sam (Sonija Kwok) leads the team at CTU. After their first case is complete, Bowie and Fa are transferred back to the CID. However, with Fa's amazing fighting skills and Bowie's great aim/hand eye coordination, Sam thinks they should be part of CTU, so she tells them to go through the training and try to apply for a position.

In the series, there are four major cases which the CTU investigates:

 The first case is about a guy named Lin Hok Man who is a business man but spends money in buying illegal fire arms. Sam sends an undercover cop, Bill, which later requests to be relieved of duty because he knows Lin Hok Man knows about his identity. Bill is later killed by Lin Hok Man's henchmen. After Bill dies, Sam is very upset and regrets not taking Bill's advise when he asked to stop. Her boss tells Sam to find another cop to go undercover but she advises they shouldn't. Her boss sticks to what he decided and Sam has to choose someone to go undercover. While this is going on, Fa and Bowie are in CTU training and having completed it they are now accepted into the team with two other men. When they arrive to CTU, Sam decides to send Fa to be her undercover cop. With CTU backing her up, she accepts the challenge and takes the identity of Flora. Fa slowly blends in and becomes Lin Hok Man's girlfriend. However, being the careful man he was, Lin Hok Man soon suspects her identity. Sure enough, when he tests his theory, cops arrived at his designated location. He sends his bodyguard Herman to kill Fa. With CTU losing connection with Fa, she gets into a big fight with Herman. After a thrilling showdown, Bowie and Sam arrive on the scene and aid Fa in fighting Herman. They soon kill Herman but Lin Hok Man tells his men to blow up all the weapons and most of the evidence is destroyed. Lin Hok Man is trialed for breaking maritime and business law. He decides to plead guilty because he knows he will get a lighter sentence.
 The second case is about an anthrax threat. The person responsible demands HK$1 billion to stop the threat. After a while, the CTU manages to capture him in an alley. They find no evidence on him. Before his arrest, he placed the tube of anthrax in a bag of a little boy who was studying at the alley. The boy is the son of a coffee shop worker, Lee Chin Jun (Ram Tseung), who leaves the boy in the alley behind the shop when he is working. The boy's mother is in China but will be coming to Hong Kong soon. When she arrives, the coffee shop owner offers her a job to work in the store room. Later, she is raped by the coffee shop owner while she is working. When her husband is confronting the shop owner, she is hit by a car of a gangster. After his wife's death, he falls into the state of depression. He finds the tube of anthrax in his son's bag and decides to take revenge for his wife. He kills the gangster and the coffee shop owner with the tube of anthrax. Later, social services takes his son into foster care because the father has been abusing him. During the court trial for his child, he kidnaps his child with a gun and threatens to use the anthrax if the police come near. When he is near a cinema he spots the CTU personnel, and holds the tube out. Bowie is the only person who has a clear shot of him and is ordered to neutralise him. She shoots him in the chest ending the case.
 The third case is about a political assassination. Lee Tin Wah (Stephen Au) is a body guard for a politician visiting Hong Kong, and sees the police as incompetent. CTU is sent in to aid with the protection of the politician. Sam puts Fa in charge of the case. Lee Tin Wah and Fa don't get along very well in the beginning. Lee Tin Wah doesn't cooperate well with Fa and the rest of CTU. Fa is very careful and Lee Tin Wah believes in his ability to protect his client. In a situation with an undercover bellboy, Fa kills the assassin bellboy and Lee Tin Wah seems to loosen up a bit with Fa. Fa doesn't give up and in the act to get the run down for the next few days from Lee Tin Wah, Fa follows him the rest of the day. Fa then finds out that it's not Lee Tin Wah's fault but it's the politician who is uncooperative. In an event in which the politician has to attend, assassins started firing and Lee Tin Wah and Fa end up running into a building by themselves to capture the assassin. Lee Tin Wah fires the assassin's gun into Fa's chest (having known she was wear a bulletproof vest) and knocks the assassin unconscious and the case ends. Lee Tin Wah and Fa then become friends and Fa is happy that Lee Tin Wah saved her life. Lee Tin Wah then flies back with the politician and leaves.
 The final case begins when Lin Hok Man is released since he had a light sentence and wants revenge on Sam and Fa for what they did earlier. Lee Tin Wah comes back to Hong Kong and tells Fa he loves her and that he has a new job as Lin Hok Man's bodyguard. Fa finds out that Lee Tin Wah and Lee Gin Keung (Patrick Tam), her next door neighbor who she likes, are actually brothers. Lin Hok Man had in fact implanted Felix, a computer genius, inside the CTU himself. Later on Lin Hok Man kills Felix's wife and daughter and Felix is very upset and tries to take revenge. Felix goes to kill Lin Hok Man but is killed instead by his bodyguards. Fa goes after Felix but is captured by Lin Hok Man. Lin Hok Man tests Lee Tin Wah's faithfulness orders him to kill her. Lee Tin Wah couldn't bring himself to kill Fa so he shots her in the leg and in the chest knowing she would be wearing a bulletproof vest. Fa is injured and sees Lee Gin Keung's feelings for her but she knows he's with Sam now. Sam is told to rest from her job due to an incident earlier with a witness. The witness was supposed to prove Lin Hok Man was evil but Lin Hok Man went and bribed the witness and told him to say that the CTU members were abusing him and not listening to his needs and taking his freedom away. He then was sent to the hospital because he tried to commit suicide. He later dies because Lin Hok Man sends men in to pretend to be doctors and gives the witness a shot which kills him. Sam is blamed for this and is told to take a rest from work. Sam is getting strange emails in giving her tips about Lin Hok Man. Sam doesn't know who it is but has a hint after Fa was shot. Sam finds out that it was Lee Tin Wah and finds out that he's undercover CIA. The CIA told Lee Tin Wah to stop the mission and Lee Tin Wah goes to CTU for help and asks them to back him up. Later Lin Hok Man finds out about Lee Tin Wah and captures him. Lin Hok Man is angry that his plans were all spoiled and tells Lee Tin Wah that he will kill him, the girl he loves and his only brother. Fa, being at the hospital, just woke up from a coma a few days ago. Lee Gin Keung is at the hospital with her and Fa notices an assassin sent to kill them. She and Lee Gin Keung try to escape but Lee Gin Keung is captured and Fa escapes. Sam finds out about Lin Hok Man's plan to leave Hong Kong. Sam is also now told to come back from her break and re-lead the team. Sam and the rest of CTU go to the location in which Lin Hok Man will leave from they set up their positions. Just before they leave, they see Fa who says she wants to join the mission. Sam lets her and they take off. They see Lin Hok Man but he has Lee Tin Wah and Lee Gin Keung with him. A random shooter comes from a boat and shoots Lin Hok Man to death. Lee Tin Wah then escapes and they kill Lin Hok Man's bodyguards. The problem now is that Lee Tin Wah and Lee Gin Keung have bombs attached to them with only a few seconds left. Lin Tin Wah removes the bomb from Lee Gin Keung and he jumps into the ocean. With everyone believing he was dead, he suddenly floats back up and is alive. The case is then ended.

After this, the story goes on about how Sam and Fa force Lee Gin Keung to choose one of them but he runs away from his problems. Bowie comes up with a plan in which was at 12 o'clock, depending on which color the building turned would decide which girl he chose. If the building turns blue at midnight, he would choose Fa, and if turns red, he would choose Sam. The three of them wait for the answer, but in the end, the two girls walk away realizing it does not matter who Keung will choose. Bowie and Ming also break up. Sam, Fa, and Bowie continue on with their lives as independent women realizing they don't need men to be happy. Keung starts a family of his own with an unknown woman and a child.

Cast
Charmaine Sheh (佘詩曼) as Yiu Lai Fa 姚麗花
Sonija Kwok (郭羡妮) as Song Lok Kei 宋樂琦 (Sam)
Shirley Yeung (楊思琦) as Tong Bo Yee 唐寶兒 (Bowie)
Patrick Tam (譚耀文) as Lee Gin Keung 李堅強
Timmy Hung (洪天明) as Si Yut Ming 史一鳴
Bill Chan (石修) as Lin Hok Mun 連學文
Gilbert Lam (林韋辰) as Yeung Siu Fung 楊少峰
Stephen Au (歐錦棠) as Lee Tin Wah 李天華
Claire Yiu (姚嘉妮) as Fong Siu Lan 方小嫻 (Susan)
Lo Bun (羅莽) as Yiu Ying Biao 姚英彪 (Yiu Lai Fa's Father)
Lok Dat Wah (駱達華) as Liu Sur Git 呂俊傑
Catherine Chau (周家怡) as Jammy
Wong Duk Mo (黃德斌) as Sum Tzi Hung 金子雄
Ram Tseung (蔣志光) as Lee Chin Jun 李前進
Lawrence Yan (甄志強) as Tom
Law Lan (羅蘭) as 六姐

See also
24
Charlie's Angels

External links
Review of the series

TVB dramas
2004 Hong Kong television series debuts
2004 Hong Kong television series endings